Live and Loud is a live video release by American rock band Sevendust, shot at Metro Chicago on September 16, 1998. It was directed by Mark Haefali.

Track listing
 "Black"
 "Speak"
 "Too Close to Hate"
 "Bitch"
 "Prayer"
 "Terminator"

References

1998 video albums
Live video albums
Sevendust albums
TVT Records video albums